The Confidente is a weekly tabloid newspaper in Namibia. It was established by Max Hamata in 2011 as a weekly newspaper. It publishes in English.

References

External links
 The Confidente - official website

2011 establishments in Namibia
Publications established in 2011
Weekly newspapers published in Namibia
English-language newspapers published in Namibia